Dzirijumati is a village in the Ozurgeti Municipality of Guria in western Georgia. Within the village is the Jumati monastery.

References

Populated places in Ozurgeti Municipality